The Valle di Muggio is situated in Ticino in Switzerland and is the southernmost valley of the country.

The name comes from the town of Muggio, which is the largest population centre in the valley.  Roncapiano is the highest village in the valley, where the roads end. The river Breggia runs through it, before flowing into Italy  and Lake Como.

La valley comprises the municipalities of Breggia, Vacallo and Castel San Pietro.

In the town of Cabbio there is the Museo Etnografico della Valle di Muggio, which describes village life in the region.

The Valle di Muggio is known as the Valle Breggia in Italy.

References 

Muggio